Klotz as a surname (German for block) can refer to:

 Klotz (violin makers), a family of German violin makers (also spelt Kloz and Cloz)

 Klotz (fire Fighters), a family of Chicago area firefighters

People 
 Adolf Klotz, Croatian linguist and writer
 August Klett (Pseudonym: August Klotz), German artist
 Christian Adolph Klotz (1738–1771), German philosopher and writer
 Christopher Klotz (born 1984), American soccer player
 Clemens Klotz (1886–1969), German architect
 Clyde Klotz (born 1961), art director
 Florence Klotz (1920–2006), costume designer
 Frank Klotz (born 1950), U.S. Air Force general
 Ignatius Klotz (1843–1911), American farmer and politician
 Jeff S. Klotz (born 1990), German Author, publisher, museum director and entrepreneur
 Józef Klotz (1900–1941), Polish footballer 
 Karlheinz Klotz (born 1950), German sprinter
 Louis Klotz, Basketball player, nicknamed "Red"
 Louis-Lucien Klotz (1868–1930), French politician
 Martin Klotz (fl. 1800), Austrian mountaineer
 Mathias Klotz (born 1965), Chilean architect
 Nicolas Klotz (born 1954), French film director
 Otto Julius Klotz (1852–1923), Canadian astronomer and Dominion Surveyor
 Reinhold Klotz (1807–1870), German classical scholar
 Robert Klotz (1819–1895), American politician
 Sebastian Klotz (1696–1775), violin maker
 Suzanne Klotz (born 1944), artist
 Ulrike Klotz (born 1970), German gymnast
 Stephen Klotz (born 1994), Computer Scientist

Characters 
 Hans Klotz, from the French television series Code Lyoko
 Roger Klotz, from the American television series Doug

See also 
 Cloots

German-language surnames
Surnames from nicknames